In probability theory, an empirical measure is a random measure arising from a particular realization of a (usually finite) sequence of random variables.  The precise definition is found below.  Empirical measures are relevant to mathematical statistics.

The motivation for studying empirical measures is that it is often impossible to know the true underlying probability measure  .  We collect observations    and compute relative frequencies.  We can estimate , or a related distribution function  by means of the empirical measure or empirical distribution function, respectively. These are uniformly good estimates under certain conditions. Theorems in the area of empirical processes provide rates of this convergence.

Definition

Let  be a sequence of independent identically distributed random variables with values in  the state space S with probability distribution P.

Definition
The empirical measure Pn is defined for measurable subsets of S and given by

Properties
For a fixed measurable set A, nPn(A) is a binomial random variable with mean nP(A) and variance nP(A)(1 − P(A)).
In particular, Pn(A) is an unbiased estimator of P(A).
For a fixed partition  of S, random variables  form a multinomial distribution with event probabilities 

Definition

To generalize this notion further, observe that the empirical measure  maps measurable functions  to their empirical mean,

In particular, the empirical measure of A is simply the empirical mean of the indicator function, Pn(A) = Pn IA.

For a fixed measurable function ,  is a random variable with mean  and variance .

By the strong law of large numbers, Pn(A) converges to P(A) almost surely for fixed A. Similarly  converges to  almost surely for a fixed measurable function . The problem of uniform convergence of Pn to P was open until Vapnik and Chervonenkis solved it in 1968.

In other words, with probability 1 we have

Empirical distribution function

The empirical distribution function provides an example of empirical measures. For real-valued iid random variables  it is given by

In this case, empirical measures are indexed by a class  It has been shown that  is a uniform Glivenko–Cantelli class, in particular,

with probability 1.

See also
 Empirical risk minimization
 Poisson random measure

References

Further reading

Measures (measure theory)
Empirical process